Drávakeresztúr is a village in Baranya county, Hungary.

On the outskirts of the settlement, the Croatian-Hungarian border section of the “Iron Curtain” route No. 13 of the EuroVelo international cycle path network passes, the section No. 3 between Drávatamási and Drávasztára touches the village.
 Local statistics

References

Populated places in Baranya County